George C. Smith may refer to:

 George Curtis Smith (1935-2020), Ohio federal judge
 George C. Smith (Mississippi politician), fl. 1870s
 George C. Smith (Wisconsin politician), fl. 1850s

See also
 George Smith (disambiguation)